Her Majesty may refer to:

 Majesty, a style used by monarchs
 Margrethe II of Denmark, Queen of Denmark
 "Her Majesty" (song), a 1969 song by the Beatles about Queen Elizabeth II
 Her Majesty the Decemberists, an album from The Decemberists
 Her Majesty (2001 film), a New Zealand film about a young girl, her Maori friend and the visit of the young Queen Elizabeth II in New Zealand
 Her Majesty (1922 film), an American silent comedy film

See also
 His Majesty (disambiguation)
 Majesty (disambiguation)
 Majestic (disambiguation)